The Last Healer in Forbidden City (literally "The Last Imperial Physician") is a 2016 Hong Kong historical fiction television drama produced by TVB, starring Roger Kwok and Tavia Yeung as the main leads, produced by Nelson Cheung. It premiered on March 28, 2016, airing every Monday to Friday on Hong Kong's TVB Jade, Malaysia's Astro on Demand and Australia's TVBJ channels during its 8:30–9:30 pm timeslot, concluding April 22, 2016 with a total of 20 episodes.

The Last Healer in Forbidden City is a fictional telling told through the account of a physician  of Emperor Guangxu played by Roger Kwok about the Emperor's mysterious death at the age of 37. It has long been rumored that the Guangxu Emperor was actually poisoned to death. In 2008, forensic tests done on the Guangxu Emperor remains revealed that high levels of arsenic was found in his remains. The arsenic levels were 2,000 times higher than that of ordinary levels.

Synopsis
Story takes time period in between 1898 (24th year of Guangxu) and 1908 (34th year of Guangxu), the late reign of the Qing dynasty. Skillful physician To Chung (Roger Kwok) is named the new Imperial Palace Physician when he successfully heals Empress Dowager Chee-Hei (Law Lan) from her illness. To Chung eventually grows close to the Gwong-seoi Emperor (Pierre Ngo) who is under house arrest at the Forbidden City and stripped of his powers after angering Dowager Chee-hei due to losing the First Sino-Japanese War and rebelling against her authority. To Chung also heals Gwong-seoi Emperor from his illness and helps the young emperor with his relationship with Consort Tsan (Rebecca Zhu).

However how great he is as a physician to the imperial family, To Chung cannot heal his crippled wife Hung Bak-hap (JJ Jia). Desperate to heal his wife he seeks out the services of bone-setter Fuk Ling (Tavia Yeung). Fuk Ling's treatments helps Bak-hap relieve some of her pain. Impressed by Fuk Ling, To Chung refers her to the Forbidden City where she becomes Empress Dowager Chee-hei personal bone-setter.

To Chung and Fuk Ling's friendship eventually turns romantic but his loyalty to his wife Bak-hap prevents him from further pursuing his romance interest in Fuk Ling. Fuk Ling however has ulterior motives with getting close to the imperial family as she has been tasked to kill the Gwong-seoi Emperor.

Cast
Character names are in Cantonese romanisation.

Main cast
Names of the main cast are all homophones to Chinese herbs.

Roger Kwok as To Chung (杜仲), the imperial doctor who enters the office of imperial doctors by successfully heals Empress Dowager Cixi's sleepwalking. 
Tavia Yeung as Fuk Ling (伏苓), the revolutionist and a bone doctor.

Imperial Qing
Law Lan as Empress Dowager Chee-hei (慈禧太后)
Pierre Ngo as Kwong-shui Emperor (光緒帝)
Rebecca Zhu as Consort Chun (珍妃)
Jonathan Cheung as Tsoi-fung, Prince Shun (醇親王載灃)
Regen Cheung as Yau Lan (幼蘭)
William Hu as Tsoi-yi, Prince Tuen (端郡王載漪)
Pauline Chow as Empress Lung-yue (隆裕皇后)
Janice Shum as Noble Consort Wai (慧貴妃)
Amy Fan as Noble Consort Yue (瑜貴妃)
Lee Yee-man as Consort Kan (瑾妃)
Kirby Lam as  Princess Yuen Kai (涴佳格格)
Rainky Wai as Tak Ling (德齡)
Jazz Lam as Kot Kan (葛根), Fuk Ling's Chuen Yan House staff and later an imperial guard.
Tsoi Kwok-hing as Yuan Sai-hoi (袁世凱)

Extended cast
JJ Jia as Hung Bak-hap (洪百合), To's wife who is a disable, and using a wooden wheelchair to walk instead
Stanley Cheung as Yam Sek-gang (任錫庚), an imperial doctor who is a closed friend of To
Eileen Yeow as To's elder sister who always worries about To's heritage.
Yu Chi-ming as Lee Lin-Ying (李連英)

Development
The costume fitting ceremony and blessing ceremony was held together on May 12, 2015 at 4:00 pm Tseung Kwan O TVB City Studio 15.
A promo image of The Last Healer in Forbidden City was featured in TVB's 2016 calendar for the month of October .
The Last Healer in Forbidden City was one of five dramas shelved by new TVB CEO Mark Lee (李寶安) in early 2016, as he considered the drama low quality and not fit to be broadcast.

Viewership ratings

International broadcast

Awards and nominations

Related history events
 Boxer Rebellion
 Eight-Nation Alliance

References

External links
The Last Healer In Forbidden City Official TVB website 

TVB dramas
Hong Kong television series
2016 Hong Kong television series debuts
2016 Hong Kong television series endings
2010s Hong Kong television series
Television series set in the Qing dynasty
Monarchy in fiction
Cultural depictions of Empress Dowager Cixi